Comfortable Swagg is the seventh studio album by Jon B. It was released on Valentine's Day, February 14, 2012. The album spawned two singles and videos: the title track and "Only One." The album is notable for being Jon B.'s first recording without marketing, promotion and distribution from a major label. His last two recordings, Stronger Everyday and Helpless Romantic, were released on smaller labels, but still had promotion and distribution from Sony BMG and Universal Music Group's Fontana Distribution, respectively.

Although Comfortable Swagg was released in 2012, a couple of the songs on the album were recorded as early as 2009. An unfinished version of "Fill Your Cup" was leaked to the internet in May 2010 without a second verse from DJ Quik.

Track listing
All songs were written by Jonathan Buck except as noted.
 "Comfortable Swagg"  4:06
 "Goin' Down"  (Jonathan Buck, Adonis Shropshire) 4:23
 "Watch'n Now"  4:44
 "Fill Your Cup" (featuring DJ Quik) (Jonathan Buck, David Blake) 5:47
 "Make Up Love"  5:20
 "Only One"  5:10
 "Baby Maker"  3:35
 "My Distraction"  3:58
 "Drowning"  5:41
 "Do U Miss Me?"  5:13
 "Your Karma Sutra"  3:53
 "Amnesia"  4:07

Personnel
 Jon B. - songwriter, producer
 Adonis Shropshire - songwriter, producer
 Jonesii - background vocals
 DJ Quik - rap
 Stephen Marsh - mastering
 Efani Allah (CreativeClientele) - photography

References

https://web.archive.org/web/20080926171305/http://d2c.m.getmusic.com/artist/catalog/default/list?path=%2Flive%2Fartists%2Fj%2Fjon_b

2012 albums
Jon B. albums